Gärdehov is an indoor arena located in Sundsvall, Sweden, and built in 1966. The ice hockey arena has a capacity of 2,500 spectators (previously 3,300) since the renovation of the arena in summer 2009, and is IF Sundsvall Hockey's home arena.

The arena also holds a bandy field, which is used for home games by Selånger SK Bandy.

References 

Indoor arenas in Sweden
Indoor ice hockey venues in Sweden
Ice hockey venues in Sweden
Bandy venues in Sweden
Sports venues completed in 1966
Sport in Sundsvall
Buildings and structures in Västernorrland County
1966 establishments in Sweden